Jules Goedhuys (8 July 1905 – 7 August 1997) was a Belgian racing cyclist. He rode in the 1931 Tour de France.

References

External links
 

1905 births
1997 deaths
Belgian male cyclists
Place of birth missing